Peker may refer to:

Given name
Peker Açıkalın (born 1963), Turkish actor

Surname
Ahmet Peker (born 1989), Turkish wrestler
Hakan Peker (born 1961), Turkish dancer, songwriter, singer and music composer
Kaya Peker (born 1980), Turkish professional basketball player
Recep Peker (1889–1950), Turkish prime minister
Sedat Peker (born 1970), Turkish organized crime boss
Tamer Peker (born 1970), Turkish opera tic baritone

Turkish-language surnames